Medal “100th anniversary of the Azerbaijani army” is a state award of Azerbaijan dedicated to the 100th anniversary of the Azerbaijani army. The award was established on June 30, 2017, in accordance with the law numbered 760-VQD.

Description of the medal 
The medal “100 years of the Azerbaijani army (1918–2018)” is a 37 mm x 50 mm rectangle connected with an eight-pointed star consisting of bronze. This in turn is covered by a golden surface.

Basement for award 
The medal is awarded to the serviceman of the Armed Forces of Azerbaijan who completed active military service until June 26, 2018. Besides, later retired are also awarded for their several efforts such as successes in combat training, special differences on exercises in combat training, courage, dedication and other merits in the period of military service and active participation in the creation and strengthening of the Azerbaijani army.

The way of wearing 
The medal “100 years of the Azerbaijani army (1918–2018)” is worn on the left side of the chest and with other orders and medals of Azerbaijan is placed after the medal “95th anniversary of the Armed Forces of Azerbaijan (1918–2013)”.

Recipients 
General Zubair Mahmood Hayat - Chairman, Joint Chief of Staff (Pakistan) (2016 - 2019)

References 

Military awards and decorations of Azerbaijan
Awards established in 2017
2017 establishments in Azerbaijan